Ahmad Abdel-Halim Abdel-Salam Al-Zugheir (born 14 September 1986) is a Jordanian footballer who plays for Sahab and the Jordan national football team.

Career
Abdel-Halim, who normally plays as a left-winger but can also operate as a left back, has always been known as the "Asian Roberto Carlos" due to his thunderous left-foot and long range shots, thumping free-kicks and corner kicks, which are similar to that of the former Brazilian international star Roberto Carlos.

Many fans of Al-Wahdat and Jordan refer to him as the following nicknames "Al-Andalib", "Haleem of Al-Wahdat", and "Al-Madfaaji".

Honors and participation in international tournaments

In Asian Games
2006 Asian Games

In AFC Asian Cups
2011 Asian Cup

In WAFF Championships
2010 WAFF Championship

International goals

With U-23 Team

With Senior Team

References

External links
 
 
 

1986 births
Living people
Jordanian people of Palestinian descent
Jordanian footballers
Jordan international footballers
2011 AFC Asian Cup players
Al-Wehdat SC players
Shabab Al-Ordon Club players
Sahab SC players
Al-Ramtha SC players
Al-Sareeh SC players
That Ras Club players
Al-Baqa'a Club players
Shabab Al-Khalil SC players
Al-Nasr SC (Salalah) players
Footballers at the 2006 Asian Games
Sportspeople from Amman
Expatriate footballers in the State of Palestine
West Bank Premier League players
Jordanian expatriate footballers
Jordanian Pro League players
Oman Professional League players
Jordanian expatriate sportspeople in Oman
Expatriate sportspeople in Oman
Expatriate sportspeople in the State of Palestine
Jordanian expatriate sportspeople in the State of Palestine
Association football fullbacks
Association football wingers
Asian Games competitors for Jordan